Bradley is a village in the Craven district of North Yorkshire, England. Bradley is divided into two parts, the hamlet of High Bradley and the village of Low Bradley, known collectively as Bradleys Both although traditionally the village used to be named Bradley Ambo.

History 

The Leeds and Liverpool Canal passes through the village. The Bradley section of the canal was completed in 1775. Upon entering the village there is a swing bridge crossing the Leeds and Liverpool Canal. A coal business was eventually established on the left of the swing bridge, complete with a wharf and weighbridge, while a coal stay and canal wharf occupied a large area to the right. Coal barges pulled by boat were a regular sight.

Bradley Mill constructed in the 1860s was renovated into 28 homes in 2005, developed by Novo Homes.

The primary school, Bradleys Both Community Primary School, was built in 1914. The name derives from the fact that the village is divided into two parts - Low Bradley and High Bradley.

On 22 April 2007, a Polish war memorial was unveiled by the canal, in memory of seven Polish airmen who died when their plane crashed near Skipton in 1943.

Industry 
In the past, quarrying supplied slate and stone for building materials but most of the villagers were engaged in hand looming and wool combing in their own homes.

In the mid-1860s, industry started to develop in Bradley in the form of spinning and weaving mills.
Weaving was carried out at Rose Shed Mill, which was redeveloped into Browns Court in the late 1990s.

References

External links 

 Bradley Village Homepage
 Bradley Mill Homepage
 Bradley Village Store
 Bradley Cricket Club
 Bradley Village Hall

Villages in North Yorkshire
Craven District